John Dunn Macaulay (born April 27, 1959) is a physician and former American football center who played two seasons with the San Francisco 49ers of the National Football League. He was drafted by the Green Bay Packers in the eleventh round of the 1982 NFL Draft. Macaulay played college football at Stanford University and attended Bonita Vista High School in Chula Vista, California. He was a member of the San Francisco 49ers team that won Super Bowl XIX.

In June 2013, Macaulay had his Super Bowl ring returned to him after he had left it in an airport bathroom earlier in the day.

References

External links
Just Sports Stats
Fanbase profile

Living people
1959 births
Players of American football from San Diego
American football centers
Stanford Cardinal football players
San Francisco 49ers players